UFC 101: Declaration was a mixed martial arts pay-per-view event held by the Ultimate Fighting Championship (UFC) on August 8, 2009 in Philadelphia, Pennsylvania. It was the first UFC event held in Philadelphia. The event featured the second title defense of Lightweight Champion BJ Penn against Kenny Florian, and a non-title Light Heavyweight bout for Middleweight Champion Anderson Silva against former Light Heavyweight Champion Forrest Griffin.

Background
A previously announced bout between Rousimar Palhares and Alessio Sakara was cancelled due to a broken leg suffered by Palhares during training. Thales Leites stepped in to face Sakara.

George Roop stepped in against George Sotiropoulos after Rob Emerson pulled out of the matchup due to a cut requiring stitches.

Results

Bonus awards
Fighters were awarded $60,000 bonuses.
Fight of the Night: Anderson Silva vs. Forrest Griffin
Knockout of the Night: Anderson Silva
Submission of the Night: B.J. Penn

See also
 Ultimate Fighting Championship
 List of UFC champions
 List of UFC events
 2009 in UFC

References

Ultimate Fighting Championship events
2009 in mixed martial arts
Mixed martial arts in Pennsylvania
Sports competitions in Philadelphia
2009 in sports in Pennsylvania
Events in Philadelphia